Marshall Gold Discovery State Historic Park is a state park of California, United States, marking the discovery of gold by James W. Marshall at Sutter's Mill in 1848, sparking the California Gold Rush.  The park grounds include much of the historic town of Coloma, California, which is now considered a ghost town as well as a National Historic Landmark District.  The park contains two California Historical Landmarks: a monument to commemorate James Marshall (#143) and the actual spot where he first discovered gold in 1848 (#530). Established in 1942, the park now comprises .

Features
The entire route of California State Route 153 lies within the park, and allows visitors to drive to the top of the hill where the monument to James W. Marshall stands.  The Gold Discovery Museum features gold-rush-era exhibits including mining equipment, horse-drawn vehicles, household implements and other memorabilia.  The American River Nature Center, operated by the American River Conservancy, features murals of local wildlife, hands-on exhibits, animal mounts and live small animals.

History
In 1886 the members of the Native Sons of the Golden West, Placerville Parlor #9, felt that the Marshall deserved a monument to mark the grave of the "Discoverer of Gold".  In May 1890, five years after Marshall's death, Placerville Parlor #9 successfully advocated the idea of a monument to the State Legislature, which appropriated a total of $9,000 for the construction of the monument and tomb, the first such monument erected in California.  A statue of Marshall stands on top of the monument, pointing to the spot where he made his discovery in 1848. The monument was rededicated October 8, 2010 by the Native Sons of the Golden West, Georgetown Parlor #91, in honor of the 200th Anniversary of James W. Marshall's birth.

See also
List of California state parks

References

External links 

 Marshall Gold Discovery State Historic Park
 Gold Discovery Park Association
 American River Nature Center

1848 in California
1942 establishments in California
California Gold Rush
California Historical Landmarks
California State Historic Parks
History of El Dorado County, California
John Sutter
Mining museums in California
Museums in El Dorado County, California
Nature centers in California
Open-air museums in California
Protected areas established in 1942
National Park Service rustic in California